Bodrost is a tourism and ski resort near Blagoevgrad, Bulgaria. It is an entry point to the Rila National Park. The Bodrost hut is located in the resort.

External links
Rila National Park website
Surroundings of Blagoevgrad

Ski areas and resorts in Bulgaria
Geography of Blagoevgrad Province
Tourist attractions in Blagoevgrad Province